Kafireas is a former community in Euboea, Greece, named after the nearby Cape Kafireas. Since the 2011 local government reform it is part of the municipality Karystos, of which it is a municipal unit. The municipal unit has an area of 77.770 km2. Population 342 (2011). The seat of the community was in Amygdalia.  Kafireas (Cavondoros) is a Arvanitika speaking community.

References

Populated places in Euboea
Karystos
Arvanite settlements